Yongkang, formerly known as Lizhou, is a county-level city located in the central part of Zhejiang province, in the People's Republic of China. It is southeast of the Jinhua City boundary and approximately 180 km (111.8 mi) from Hangzhou. According to a 2010 census, its built-up (or metro) area of Yongkang City and Wuyi County was home to 1,426,659 inhabitants. Yongkang is known as the "hardware capital of China."

History

The Chinese name Yongkang means "eternal well-being." The city was formally established in 245CE in the Wu Kingdom, during the Three Kingdoms (220280CE) period. In the last two decades, the city has become known for both its aggressive promotion of tourism and its booming hardware manufacturing industry. It is widely considered "the hardware capital of China," though Shenzhen has also been given the title. In 2003, Yongkang's GDP ranked 47th out of over one thousand counties nationwide.

Lizhou was the ancient name of Yongkang. According to legend, when the mother of Sun Quan, the King of Wu, was ill, she went on a pilgrimage to pray for "eternal well-being" at a temple in Lizhou. After she recovered, Sun Quan was very pleased and named the area Yongkang ("eternal well-being") after her speedy recovery. At that time, it was a part of Wushang City; however, during the Tang dynasty, Yongkang was independently recognized under the name Lizhou, eventually becoming the general administrative area of Yue Prefecture.

In 1992, the State Council approved Yongkang as a county-level city.

Administrative divisions
Subdistricts:
 Dongcheng Subdistrict
 Xicheng Subdistrict
 Jiangnan Subdistrict

Towns:

Economy

Since ancient times, Yongkang has been known for its hardware production. After 30 years of reform and modernization, Yongkang evolved from traditional to modern hardware, accelerating the pace of industrial upgrading and product branding. The county then became known domestically and abroad as a "hardware capital."

The city of Yongkang has always enjoyed the name "City of Metals," as metals and machinery are its flagship industry. Other industries in the city have grown consistently, including the production of electric tools, building materials, and automobile/motorcycle accessories. Additionally, the city is a national base for the production of anti-theft doors, electric bicycles, scooters, and thermal cups.

Due to fears of industrial theft, the Yongkang door industry, which has maintained its growth since 1997, has now become the eighth-largest Yongkang hardware industry. It has 454 enterprise portal products and produces four anti-theft doors every day, accounting for 1% of the national output of anti-theft doors. 52% of the national output of stainless steel tableware and 45% of the national output of the daily-use weighing apparatus come from Yongkang, along with a third of the national output of power tools. Packaging drums, non-slip case scales and other products accounted for more than 90% of the domestic market. Scooters, gas stove burners, pumps and saw blades are its primary exports.

Geographical 
Yongkang is located in the central part of Zhejiang province, in the People's Republic of China. It is southeast of the Jinhua City boundary and approximately 180 km (111.8 mi) from Hangzhou.

Climate

Cityscape

See also
 Xijin Bridge, a famous covered bridge in China
 Yongkang railway station

References

External links
The city of doors.china doors city
Official site
City Map

County-level cities in Zhejiang
Geography of Jinhua